A heroic couplet is a traditional form for English poetry, commonly used in  epic and narrative poetry, and consisting of a rhyming pair of lines in iambic pentameter.  Use of the heroic couplet was pioneered by Geoffrey Chaucer in the Legend of Good Women and the Canterbury Tales, and generally considered to have been perfected by John Dryden and Alexander Pope in the Restoration Age and early 18th century respectively.

Example
A frequently-cited example illustrating the use of heroic couplets is this passage from Cooper's Hill by John Denham, part of his description of the Thames:

History
The term "heroic couplet" is sometimes reserved for couplets that are largely closed and self-contained, as opposed to the enjambed couplets of poets like John Donne. The heroic couplet is often identified with the English Baroque works of John Dryden and Alexander Pope, who used the form for their translations of the epics of Virgil and Homer, respectively. Major poems in the closed couplet, apart from the works of Dryden and Pope, are  Samuel Johnson's The Vanity of Human Wishes, Oliver Goldsmith's The Deserted Village, and John Keats's Lamia. The form was immensely popular in the 18th century. The looser type of couplet, with occasional enjambment, was one of the standard verse forms in medieval narrative poetry, largely because of the influence of the Canterbury Tales.

Variations
English heroic couplets, especially in Dryden and his followers, are sometimes varied by the use of the occasional alexandrine, or hexameter line, and triplet. Often these two variations are used together to heighten a climax. The breaking of the regular pattern of rhyming pentameter pairs brings about a sense of poetic closure.  Here are two examples from Book IV of Dryden's translation of the Aeneid.

Alexandrine

Alexandrine and Triplet

Modern use
Twentieth-century authors have occasionally made use of the heroic couplet, often as an allusion to the works of poets of previous centuries. An example of this is Vladimir Nabokov's novel Pale Fire, the second section of which is a 999-line, 4-canto poem largely written in loose heroic couplets with frequent enjambment. Here is an example from the first canto:

The use of heroic couplets in translations of Greco-Roman epics has also inspired translations of non-Western works into English. In 2021, Vietnamese translator Nguyen Binh published a translation of the Vietnamese epic poem Tale of Kiều, in which the lục bát couplets of the original were rendered into heroic couplets. Binh named John Dryden and Alexander Pope as major influences on their work, which also mimicked the spelling of Dryden and Pope's translations to evoke the medieval air of the Vietnamese original. An example of the heroic couplet translation can be found below:

See also
 Metre (poetry)
 Iambic pentameter
 Foot (prosody)
 Heroic verse

References

Poetic forms